No Trace is a Canadian drama film, directed by Simon Lavoie and released in 2021. An exploration of the conflict between rationality and faith, the film centres on N (Monique Gosselin), a cynical smuggler who is escorting Awa (Nathalie Doummar), a devoutly religious woman, to their country's border after an unspecified event has threatened Awa's safety.

The film premiered at the 2021 Slamdance Film Festival, where it won a Grand Jury Prize in the Breakouts category. It had its Canadian premiere at the Rendez-vous Québec Cinéma, before opening commercially in May.

References

External links

2021 films
2021 drama films
Canadian drama films
Canadian black-and-white films
Films shot in Quebec
Films directed by Simon Lavoie
2020s French-language films
French-language Canadian films
2020s Canadian films